Mona may refer to:

People
Mona (name), a female given name, nickname and surname
Mona (Angolan footballer) (born 1997)
Mona, ring name of American wrestler Nora Greenwald

Museums
Museum of Nebraska Art, Kearney, Nebraska, US
Museum of Neon Art, Los Angeles, California, United States
Museum of Northwest Art, La Conner, Washington, United States
Museum of Old and New Art, Hobart, Tasmania, Australia

Music
Mona (band), a Nashville-located alternative rock band
Mona (album), released in 2011
"Mona", a song by James Taylor from his 1985 album That's Why I'm Here
"Mona", a song by the Beach Boys from their 1977 album Love You
Mona – The Carnivorous Circus, a 1970 record by The Deviants
"Mona (I Need You Baby)", a 1957 song by Bo Diddley
Mona (opera), a 1912 opera by Horatio Parker

Places

Settlements
Mona, Anglesey, a village on the Welsh island of Anglesey (in the UK)
Mona, Iowa, United States, an unincorporated community
Mona, Jamaica, a residential neighbourhood of Kingston
Mona, South Australia, part of the town of Bute, Australia
Mona, Utah, United States, a city
Mona Mona, Queensland, a locality in the Shire of Mareeba, Queensland, Australia
Mona Township, Ford County, Illinois, United States

Landforms
Anglesey, an island off the north-west coast of Wales
Isla de Mona, Puerto Rico, an island in the Mona Passage
Isle of Man, a self-governing British Crown dependency in the Irish Sea
Mona Islands, Siberia, Russia
Mona Lake, Michigan, United States
Mona Passage, separating the islands of Hispaniola and Puerto Rico
Mona Reservoir, Utah, United States

Fictional locations
Isle of Mona, a fictionalized version of the Isle of Anglesey in Lloyd Alexander's "The Chronicles of Prydain" series

Science and technology
Aechmea 'Mona', a hybrid cultivar
Modular Neutron Array
 MONA numbering scheme used for moths of North America, also called a Hodges number

Ships and boats
 , a British paddle steamer
 , a British packet steamer
 , a British paddle steamer originally named Calais/Douvres
 , a British packet steamer originally named Hazel
 , a United States Navy patrol boat in commission from 1918 to 1919
 RNLB Mona (ON 775), 1935, a lifeboat based at Broughty Ferry in Scotland
 , a wooden paddle steamer operated by the Isle of Man Steam Packet Company
 , an iron paddle steamer operated by the Isle of Man Steam Packet Company, sank in a storm in Liverpool Bay in 1909
 , a paddle steamer operated by the Isle of Man Steam Packet Company until she was purchased by [he Admiralty in 1915
 , a packet steamer operated by the South Eastern & Chatham Railway Company and the Isle of Man Steam Packet Company
 , a Swedish coaster in service 1957–63
 , a Greek cargo ship wrecked in 1976
 , a passenger vessel operated by the Isle of Man Steam Packet Company
 , a roll on - roll off car and passenger ferry operated by the Isle of Man Steam Packet Company

Other uses
Monā, an ASCII art character
Mona (deity), in mythology
Mona (elephant), at Birmingham Zoo in the United States
Mona language (disambiguation)
Mona Modern English Medium School, Sarangarh, Chhattisgarh, India
Mona monkey, a species of monkey that lives through Western Africa and the Caribbean
Mona railway station, Pakistan
Mona or Mouna, an Algerian pastry 
RAF Mona, a Royal Air Force station on the island of Anglesey, Wales
Mona the Virgin Nymph, also known as Mona, a 1970 theatrical release pornographic film
Mona, a 2019 novel by Argentinian author Pola Oloixarac

See also
 Moana (disambiguation)
 Moina (disambiguation)